Nicholas Goldman is a group leader and senior scientist at the European Bioinformatics Institute (EBI), located on the Wellcome Genome Campus in Hinxton, Cambridgeshire, England. He began working at the EBI in 2002, and became a senior scientist there in 2009. His group's research focuses on evolutionary genetics and genomics. He and his EBI colleague Ewan Birney, along with other researchers, developed a tool for DNA digital data storage, on which they successfully encoded all the sonnets of William Shakespeare, Martin Luther King Jr.'s 1963 "I Have a Dream" speech, a PDF of the 1953 paper "Molecular Structure of Nucleic Acids: A Structure for Deoxyribose Nucleic Acid", and a photo of their own institute. They described their results in a 2013 paper in Nature.

References

External links
Faculty profile

Living people
British bioinformaticians
English geneticists
Alumni of the University of Cambridge
Year of birth missing (living people)